Uddemarri is a village located in Muduchintalapally (Mandal),  Tehsil of Medcha Malkajgiri district in Telangana, India. It is situated 16km away from sub-district headquarter Muduchintalapally and 45km away from district headquarter Hyderabad.  As per 2020 stats, Uddemarri village is also a gram panchayat.

References

Villages in Ranga Reddy district